Merhavia may refer to:

Merhavia (kibbutz), a kibbutz in northern Israel
Merhavia (moshav), a moshav in northern Israel originally known as the Co-operative in Merhavia